Pickaninny Buttes is a summit in San Bernardino County, California, in the United States. The butte is composed of granite.

The name has attracted criticism from the media because it contains the ethnic slur pickaninny.

References

Mountains of San Bernardino County, California